Henry Joseph Brown (1887 – 26 February 1961) was an Irish field hockey player who competed in the 1908 Summer Olympics. In 1908 he represented the United Kingdom of Great Britain and Ireland as a member of the Irish national team. He won the silver medal with the team Ireland.

References

External links
 

1887 births
1961 deaths
Members of the Ireland hockey team at the 1908 Summer Olympics
Irish male field hockey players
Medalists at the 1908 Summer Olympics
Olympic silver medallists for Great Britain
Ireland international men's field hockey players
Dublin University Hockey Club players
Three Rock Rovers Hockey Club players